In the 2009–10 season, USM Alger competed in the Division 1 for the 32nd time, as well as the Algerian Cup. It was their 15th consecutive season in the top flight of Algerian football.

Squad list
Players and squad numbers last updated on 1 September 2009.Note: Flags indicate national team as has been defined under FIFA eligibility rules. Players may hold more than one non-FIFA nationality.

Pre-season and friendlies

Competitions

Overview

Division 1

Results summary

Results by round

Matches

Algerian Cup

Squad information

Playing statistics

Appearances (Apps.) numbers are for appearances in competitive games only including sub appearances
Red card numbers denote:   Numbers in parentheses represent red cards overturned for wrongful dismissal.

Goalscorers
Includes all competitive matches. The list is sorted alphabetically by surname when total goals are equal.

Transfers

In

Out

References

USM Alger seasons
USM Alger